

Pterosaurs

New taxa

See also

References

1810s in paleontology
Paleontology